Ryūkō-ji is the name of numerous Buddhist temples in Japan. 
Below is an incomplete list:

　in Uwajima, Ehime Prefecture. It is temple No. 41 in the Shikoku Pilgrimage.
　in Fujisawa, Kanagawa Prefecture.